Duncan Woods is a male British former field hockey player.

Hockey career
Woods represented England and won a bronze medal, at the 1998 Commonwealth Games in Kuala Lumpur.

References

Living people
British male field hockey players
Commonwealth Games medallists in field hockey
Commonwealth Games bronze medallists for England
Field hockey players at the 1998 Commonwealth Games
Year of birth missing (living people)
1998 Men's Hockey World Cup players
Medallists at the 1998 Commonwealth Games